Widmark Ice Piedmont is an ice piedmont between Holtedahl and Darbel bays on Stresher Peninsula on the west coast of Graham Land. Photographed by Hunting Aerosurveys Ltd. in 1955-57 and mapped from these photos by the Falkland Islands Dependencies Survey (FIDS). Named by the United Kingdom Antarctic Place-Names Committee (UK-APC) in 1959 for Erik J. Widmark (1850–1909), Swedish ophthalmologist, pioneer of researches upon the etiology and treatment of snow blindness.

Ice piedmonts of Graham Land
Loubet Coast